Dhu Ghaithan is a sub-district located in Qaflat Othor District, 'Amran Governorate, Yemen. Dhu Ghaithan had a population of 6455 according to the 2004 census.

References 

Sub-districts in Qaflat Othor District